Ivory Tower is a 1998 American drama film about young people trying to enter the computer industry in Silicon Valley. The film was directed by Darin Ferriola, and stars Michael Ironside, Patrick Van Horn, Kari Wührer, and James Wilder.

Synopsis 
Anthony is in charge of launching a new product, however his views on life and work are challenged by a new boss willing to do whatever it takes to succeed.

Cast
 Jack Janda as Ahmad
 Patrick Van Horn as Anthony Daytona
 James Wilder as Jarvis Cone
 Michael Greene as Walter Felice
 Brian Reddy as Bob Martell
 Kari Wuhrer as Karen Clay
 Ian Buchanan as Andy Pallack
 Keith Coogan as Russ Dyerson
 Michael Ironside as Marshall Wallace
 Richard Cody as Stephen
 Garrett Wang as Mark
 Gina Mari as Tammy
 Lisa Stahl as Carol 
 Roger Clinton as Tim Cartridge

Production
Ferriola wrote the script with the film's investors in mind, after researching the likes and dislikes of potential funders. He received a budget of $700,000 with which to create the movie, which he also produced and directed. This marked Ferriola's directorial debut and the first film released through his production company One-Tu-Three Prods. Pic.

Reception

External links 
 

1998 films
1998 drama films
American drama films
1990s English-language films
1990s American films